Burgsee is a lake at Schwerin, Nordwestmecklenburg, Mecklenburg-Vorpommern, Germany.

Lakes of Mecklenburg-Western Pomerania